Clavatula colini is a species of sea snail, a marine gastropod mollusk in the family Clavatulidae.

Description
The color of the shell is rosaceous, with a superior, and an inferior brown band. The spire is longer than most species in this genus. It has a pronounced siphonal canal

Distribution
This species occurs in the Atlantic Ocean off Senegal.

References

 

colini
Gastropods described in 1883